Khara-Khoto ("black city") is an abandoned city in the Ejin Banner of Alxa League in western Inner Mongolia, China, near the Juyan Lake Basin. Built in 1032, the city thrived under the rule of the Western Xia dynasty. It has been identified as the city of Etzina, which appears in The Travels of Marco Polo, and Ejin Banner is named after this city.

Name
Khara-Khoto is known by many names, including  Hēichéng "black city", Tangut:  /*zjɨ̱r²-nja̱¹/ "black water" (transcribed into Chinese as 亦集乃 Yijinai), Modern Mongolian Khar khot (Middle Mongol language: Khara Khoto, "black city") and to Chinese as Heishui City ( Hēishuǐchéng, "black water city").

History
The city was founded in 1032 and became a thriving centre of Western Xia trade in the 11th century. There are remains of -high ramparts and -thick outer walls.

The walled fortress was first taken by Genghis Khan in 1226, but—contrary to a widely circulated misunderstanding—the city continued to flourish under Mongol rule. During Kublai Khan's time, the city was expanded, reaching a size three times larger than during the Western Xia dynasty. The Northern Yuan dynasty under Toghon Temür concentrated its preparation for the reconquest of the Central Plain at Khara-Khoto. The city was located on the crossroads connecting Karakorum, Shangdu and Kumul.

In The Travels of Marco Polo, Marco Polo describes a visit to a city called Etzina or Edzina, which has been identified with Khara-Khoto.

According to a legend of the local Torghut population, in 1372 a Mongol military general named Khara Bator was surrounded with his troops by the armies of the Ming dynasty. Diverting the Ejin River, the city's water source that flowed just outside the fortress, the Ming dynasty denied Khara-Khoto water for its gardens and wells. As time passed and Khara Bator realised his fate, he murdered his family and then himself. After his suicide, Khara Bator's soldiers waited within the fortress until Ming troops finally attacked and killed the remaining inhabitants. Another version of the legend holds that Khara Bator made a breach in the northwestern corner of the city wall and escaped through it. The remains of the city have a breach through which a rider can pass.

The defeat of the Mongols at Khara-Khoto is described in the Ming dynasty annals: "In the fifth year of Hungu (1372), General Feng Sheng and his army reached Edzina. The town's defender Buyan'temur surrendered, and Chinese troops reached the mountains of Bojiashan. The ruler of Yuan, Gyardzhipan', fled. His minister... and 27 others were captured, together with ten or more thousand head of horses and cattle." After the defeat, and also possibly due to real water shortage, the city was abandoned and left in ruins. Its exceedingly remote location preserved it from looters.

Exploration

Russian explorers Grigory Potanin and Vladimir Obruchev heard rumours that somewhere downstream the Ejin River an ancient city was waiting. This knowledge gave impetus to the Asian Museum, St. Petersburg, to launch a new Mongol-Sichuan expedition under the command of Pyotr Kuzmich Kozlov.

However, Khara-Khoto was earlier discovered by a Buryat person called Tsokto Badmazhapov in the spring of 1907. Badmazhapov sent photographs and a handwritten description of Khara-khoto to the Geographical Society in St Petersburg. On May 1, 1908, during his 1907–1909 expedition to Central Asia, Kozlov arrived at Khara-Khoto and, with a dinner and gift of a gramophone to a local Torghut lord Dashi Beile, obtained permission to dig at the site. Over 2,000 books, scrolls and manuscripts in the Tangut language were uncovered. Kozlov initially sent ten chests of manuscripts and Buddhist objects to St. Petersburg, returning again in May 1909 for more objects. The books and woodcuts were found in June, while excavating a stupa outside city walls some  westward.

Sir Aurel Stein excavated Khara-Khoto during his third Central Asian expedition from July 1913 to February 1916, surveying Khara-Khoto for eight days at the end of May 1914. The findings from this research was incorporated in chapter 13 of Stein's first volume of Innermost Asia.

Langdon Warner visited Khara-Khoto in 1925.

Folke Bergman first traveled to Khara-Khoto in 1927, returning in 1929 and staying for a year and a half in the area. He made maps of Khara-Khoto and the Ejin River area, surveyed watchtowers and fortresses, finding a large number of xylographs. Bergman noted that Kozlov's and Stein's visits were cursory and some of their published documentation was partially incorrect.

Sven Hedin and Xu Xusheng led the Sino-Swedish Expedition on archaeological excavations of the site between 1927–31. After Hedin, John DeFrancis visited in 1935.

Further Chinese excavations between 1983 and 1984 by Li Yiyou, Inner Mongolian Institute of Archaeology, have produced some 3,000 more manuscripts. In addition to books, these excavations unearthed building materials, daily items, production instruments and religious art. Satellite photos show that the site is currently being preserved.

Findings

Kozlov's findings, some 3,500 paintings and other objects, are in the Hermitage Museum, St. Petersburg, while the books and xylographs are at the Institute of Oriental Studies. These fortunately survived the Siege of Leningrad and some of them were even lost until their rediscovery in 1991, forming the basis for research of the Tangut language, written in Tangut script in subsequent years. The books and manuscripts sent back to St. Petersburg by Kozlov were studied by Aleksei Ivanovich Ivanov, who identified several Tangut dictionaries, including a Chinese-Tangut glossary titled Pearl in the Palm, compiled in 1190.

In addition to written artifacts, the Khara-Khoto collection in the Hermitage Museum includes paintings on silk, mainly of Buddhist subjects in Chinese and Tibetan styles. In addition, batik-dyed silk fragments have also been found. A small mud wall painting fragment confirms use of cobalt as a pigment in the form of smalt.

According to Hermitage curator Kira Samosyuk, "Most of the paintings in the collection date from the eleventh through thirteenth centuries, while the majority of the fragments of porcelain with cobalt decorative glazing are from the fourteenth century. No painting is of a later date than 1378–1387; no Chinese text – later than 1371; no Tangut text – later than 1212. So it seems that the life of the town ceased sometime around 1380."

One of the puzzles of Khara-Khoto is that there was one building just outside the castle walls. Judging by its shape, it seems to be a mosque. It seems there were Muslims among the people that were ruled by the Tangut. Due to the polytheistic belief of the local people, the Muslims built their mosques outside. Traders from India and the further west would have prayed in the mosque and found relief after their arduous journey along the Silk Road

Footnotes

Further reading

External links

Pictures of Khara-Khoto
Paintings from Khara Khoto

Western Xia architecture
Archaeological sites in China
Tangut history
Ancient Chinese cities
Sites along the Silk Road
1032 establishments in Asia
Alxa League